McGill–Toolen Catholic High School, founded as the McGill Institute and sometimes called "McT" for short, is a private co-educational high school operated by the educational system of the Roman Catholic Archdiocese of Mobile in Mobile, Alabama.

History 
McGill Institute was founded in 1896 by brothers Arthur and Felix McGill as a free school for boys. In 1928, the Brothers of the Sacred Heart took over the administration the school. They continue to serve on the faculty of the school. The original McGill Institute building was on Government Street, in downtown Mobile. 

In 1952, the school moved to Old Shell Road, across the street from Bishop Toolen School for Girls. Bishop Toolen School for Girls was founded in 1928 by Bishop Thomas J. Toolen and was administered by the Sisters of Loretto until it merged with McGill Institute in 1972 to form the co-educational McGill–Toolen Catholic High School.

For much of its early history, the school was segregated, with future namesake Bishop Thomas Toolen famously refusing to admit the children of Algernon J. Cooper Sr, who later became notable figures and Notre Dame grads (Algernon J. Cooper Jr, Peggy Cooper Cafritz, and Jerome G. Cooper).

In December 2007, the Mobile Register reported that supporters of the school raised $10.3 million to renovate the campus and add a new science building and student center. The science facility was opened in 2009, giving every science teacher their own classroom and lab space. The student center is a two-story building fronting Lafayette Street and includes a cafeteria, chapel, and student plaza. It was completed in 2016.

Sports and traditions
McGill-Toolen's school colors are orange and black, and the mascot is a yellowjacket. In 2006, the McGill–Toolen varsity football team won the 6A Region 1 title, their first region title in 20 years by defeating its long-time rival Murphy High School. The Yellow Jackets repeated in 2007 as the 6A Region 1 champs with an undefeated regular season record of 10–0. They advanced to the semifinals of the 2007 playoffs before losing to Prattville High School with a record of 13–1. In October 2007 the school announced the construction of a football stadium at the Archbishop Lipscomb Sports Complex. The stadium was completed in time for the 2008 season, moving McGill from Ladd–Peebles Stadium. For the 2020 season, McGill-Toolen dropped drown to a 6A team. 

In 2015, the McGill–Toolen Football Team became the Alabama 7A State Champions.

In 2016, the McGill–Toolen Men's Basketball Team became the Alabama 7A State Champions.

In 2019, the McGill-Toolen Baseball Team became the Alabama 7A State Champions.

McT Band
Established in 1896, The McGill-Toolen High School Band is one of Alabama's oldest musical organizations. Making up the band program at McGill are the Marching Band, Concert Band, Jazz Ensemble, Percussion Ensemble, Color Guard, and Winter Guard.

In 2009, the band moved into their new band hall. The band room was dedicated to and named after the longtime director of the Prep Band Program Charles "Buddy" Porter.

Notable alumni
 Frank Bolling, Former MLB player  (Detroit Tigers, Milwaukee Braves)
 Jimmy Buffett, singer and songwriter
 Sonny Callahan, U.S Representative for the 1st District of Alabama (1985–2003)
 Quincy Davis (2002), naturalised citizen of Taiwan and Chinese Taipei men's national basketball team member
 Jeremiah Denton, Jr., retired U.S. Navy Admiral, U.S. Senator, and Vietnam P.O.W.
 Bill Dooley, former Head Football Coach, Virginia Tech and Wake Forest
 Vince Dooley, former Head Football Coach, University of Georgia, (1964–1988), Athletic Director (1979–2004)
 D.J. Fluker, NFL guard for the Seattle Seahawks
 Oscar Hugh Lipscomb, Roman Catholic Archbishop of Mobile (1980–2008)
 Dan Lord, lead singer and songwriter of the band Pain
 Jonathan Mangum, comedian and actor, announcer on Let's Make a Deal
 Jim Marshall, U.S. Representative for the 3rd District of Georgia (2003–2011)
 William Moody, better known by his ring name "Paul Bearer," professional wrestling manager 
 John D. New, Medal of Honor recipient
 William H. Pryor, Jr., U.S. Court of Appeals for the Eleventh Circuit
 Ito Smith, Current Free Agent in the NFL
 Bubba Thompson, first round pick in the 2017 MLB Draft by the Texas Rangers
 Jalen Tolbert, NFL wide receiver for the Dallas Cowboys

References

High schools in Mobile, Alabama
Roman Catholic Archdiocese of Mobile
Catholic secondary schools in Alabama
Educational institutions established in 1896
1896 establishments in Alabama